Herrin is a surname. Notable people with the surname include:

Earl E. Herrin (1892–1964), American businessman and politician
Jeremy Herrin, English theatre director
Josh Herrin (born 1990), American motorcycle racer
Judith Herrin (born 1942), English archaeologist and academic
Kendra and Maliyah Herrin (born 2002), former conjoined twins
Rich Herrin (born 1933), American basketball coach
Tom Herrin (1929–1999), American baseball player
William F. Herrin (1854–1927), American lawyer, businessman and banker